The 2017 season was Negeri Sembilan's 94th year in their history and 6th season in Malaysia Premier League since it was first introduced in 2004. Also it was the forth season in the Malaysia Premier League following relegation on 2013 season. Along with the league, the club also participated in the Malaysia FA Cup and the Malaysia Cup.

Events 
On December 2016, the club signed several new players. Among them were Lee Tuck, Bruno Suzuki and Nemanja Vidić .

The Negeri Sembilan squad extended their winning record at home when they managed to beat newcomers, PKNP FC, 3-1, in the Premier League competition, at Tuanku Abdul Rahman Stadium on 3 February 2017.

On 4 March 2017, Negeri Sembilan continued to be on top of the Premier League when it defeated Kuala Lumpur 2-1 at Tuanku Abdul Rahman Stadium, Paroi.

On 13 May 2017, Negeri Sembilan met Pahang in the second leg of the Malaysia FA Cup. Previously, they were defeated by a score of 1-0 at Darul Makmur Stadium. Negeri Sembilan started off hard when Pahang managed to get a goal as early as the 6th minute. Negeri Sembilan managed to equalize in the 68th minute but were surprised by a late goal in the match on (90+2'). Negeri Sembilan lost 3-1 on aggregate.

On 21 April 2017, Negeri Sembilan managed to defeat Sabah with an aggregate of 1-0 in the FA Cup competition.

On 13 May 2017, the FA Cup semi-final second leg against Pahang ended with a 2-1 victory over Pahang with an aggregate of 3-1. Negeri Sembilan was previously defeated with a result of 1-0 in the first match at Darul Makmur Stadium.

Players

Competitions

Malaysia Premier League

League table

Malaysia FA Cup

Teams 

 6 teams from FAM League entered in the First Round. DYS and Sungai Ara withdraw from the competition.
 27 teams (12 teams from Super League, 12 teams from Premier League and three teams from FAM League) entered in the Second Round.

Second Round

Quarter-final 
|-

|}

First leg

Second leg

Semi-final 
|-

|}

First leg

Second leg

Malaysia Cup

Format 
In the competition, the top eleven teams from the First Round of 2017 Malaysia Super League were joined by the top five teams from the First Round of 2017 Malaysia Premier League. The teams were drawn into four groups of four teams.

Seeding

Group stage

Group A

Statistics

References 

Negeri Sembilan FA seasons
Negeri Sembilan